Fuman County is in Gilan province, Iran. The capital of the county is the city of Fuman. At the 2006 census, the county's population was 96,788 in 25,978 households. The following census in 2011 counted 93,737 people in 28,622 households. At the 2016 census, the county's population was 92,310 in 31,209 households.

Administrative divisions

The population history and structural changes of Fuman County's administrative divisions over three consecutive censuses are shown in the following table. The latest census shows two districts, six rural districts, and three cities.

References

 

Counties of Gilan Province